The Calvert Prong is one of the two prongs whose confluence creates the Little Warrior River in  Alabama, United States. The other prong is the Blackburn Fork.

References

Rivers of Alabama
Rivers of Blount County, Alabama